Laura Ingle is a correspondent for Fox News.

Joining the network in 2005, Ingle was originally based in Dallas, and is currently based in New York.  She has also appeared on the FNC program Geraldo Rivera Reports.
 
Prior to being hired by Fox News, Ingle reported on the Scott Peterson and Michael Jackson trials for talk radio station KFI AM 640 in Los Angeles, and served as a news anchor/reporter for KFBK in Sacramento.  At KFBK, Ingle worked with a number of current Fox News personalities, including Fox Business anchor/host and Fox News Radio host Tom Sullivan, and Fox News Radio host Spencer Hughes.

Personal life
Ingle is married to Kenny Kramme. In 2013, she gave birth to their son, Jackson Marshall Kramme.

References

External links 
 Bio on FoxNews.com

Year of birth missing (living people)
American television journalists
American women television journalists
Living people
Fox News people
21st-century American women